Cheliosea cosmeta, the sombre tiger moth, is a moth of the family Erebidae. It was described by Oswald Bertram Lower in 1907. It is found in Australia in New South Wales, the Northern Territory, Victoria and South Australia).

References

Spilosomina
Moths described in 1907